Andrew Fekete may refer to:

 Andrew Fekete (cricketer)
 Andrew Fekete (artist)